Kashmir International Half Marathon, organized by Big FM,  saw more than 30,000 people from India and other countries participate in the event which was held in Srinagar on 13 September 2015.

Events and theme
Two events were held under the banner of "I am the change":
21 km half Marathon: It was started in early morning from the University of Kashmir and passed through Dal lake and returned to Kashmir University.
Run for Fun, 5 km run. 
According to organizers, the Marathon is aimed to promote awareness in local people towards social issues like saving Dal Lake, fighting drug abuse, and keeping the city clean along with promoting traffic awareness, and respect for senior citizens and women.

Participants
More than 15,000 people took part in the Marathon; most of the foreign participants were from Kenya. Former Chief Minister of Jammu and Kashmir Omar Abdullah also participated in the Marathon.

Incidents

Disruption was caused when the Kashmiri youth raised "Pro-Freedom" and Pro-Pakistan slogans and clashed with the Indian police during the marathon. Incidents like eve-teasing, molestation and stone pelting were also witnessed. Some masked youth raised Pakistani flags at the Kashmir university campus. For eve-teasing and molestation incidents, 12 people were arrested by Indian police.

See also
 Jammu and Kashmir cricket team

References

Athletics competitions in India
Sport in Jammu and Kashmir
2015 establishments in Jammu and Kashmir
Recurring sporting events established in 2015